Make the Cowboy Robots Cry is an EP by American alt-country band Beachwood Sparks, released in 2002, which featured the return of drummer Jimi Hey.

Track listing
"Drinkswater" – 7:12
"Hibernation" – 3:27
"Ponce de Leon Blues" – 6:55
"Sing Your Thoughts" – 3:52
"Galapagos" – 4:17
"Ghost Dance 1492" – 2:58

References

Beachwood Sparks albums
2002 EPs
Sub Pop EPs